The Chinese city tier system refers to an unofficial hierarchical classification of Chinese cities in the People's Republic of China (PRC). There are no such official lists in the country, as the Chinese government does not publish or recognize any official definition or a list of cities included in the tier system. However, it is frequently referred to by various international media publications for purposes including commerce, transportation, tourism, education, among others. 

Given the rapid development of Chinese cities ever since the economic reform and the ever-changing dynamics among the country's cities, the tier system has gained wide popularity in recent years as a point of reference, such as among investors and tourists. Cities in different tiers often reflect differences in consumer behavior, income level, population size, consumer sophistication, infrastructure, talent pool, and business opportunity, among others. The tier system typically includes cities in mainland China only; therefore the special administrative regions (SARs) of Hong Kong and Macau as well as cities of the Republic of China (ROC) are not included on the list.

Background 
Many economists, consultants and businesses classify cities in China based on the tier system. Businesses frequently refer to the tier system in, for example, devising marketing strategy, as it is understood that treating China as one market is simply not feasible: consumers from different regions and cities have vastly different income levels, behaviors, and trends. Cities in different tiers also differ greatly in population size, infrastructure, and the level of sophistication in products and services.

Given the sheer number of cities in China, there is not a single version of this classification. According to many media publications, it is understood that there are four tiers, and the consensus is that four cities belong to Tier-1: Beijing, Shanghai, Guangzhou, and Shenzhen (colloquially known as “Bei-Shang-Guang-Shen”, 北上广深). First-tier cities represent the most developed areas of the country with the most affluent and sophisticated consumers. They are large, densely populated urban metropolises that have huge economic, cultural and political influence in China.

Classification

Yicai Global 
In 2017, Yicai Global, a financial magazine, published an unofficial tiered list of the Most Commercially Charming Cities in China, ranking 338 Chinese cities above or at the prefectural level based on the latest business data from 160 commercial brands, customer behavior data from 17 internet companies and Big Data on cities compiled by research institutions. The new ranking assessed the commercial attractiveness of 338 cities drawing from data on five dimensions: (1) concentration of commercial resources, (2) the extent to which a city serves as a commercial hub, (3) vitality of urban residents, (4) diversity of lifestyle, (5) future dynamism. The list below shows Yicai Global's 2017 classification, which contains 338 cities ranked on 6 tiers: tier 1, new tier 1, tier 2, tier 3, tier 4, and tier 5.

It is important to note that a "city" in China may refer to an administrative unit at different levels. In short, while there are 334 prefectural-level units in China, there are 2,851 units at the county level, and 39,864 units at the township level. This list includes only units at the prefectural level, the second highest administrative division in China. A "prefectural-level" administrative unit can be a city, a prefecture, an autonomous prefecture, and a league. The four direct municipalities, Beijing, Shanghai, Chongqing, and Tianjin are also considered cities even though they are officially provincial-level administrative units. It is for these reasons that Yicai Global's published list includes 338 "cities": namely all of the 334 prefectural-level units plus the 4 direct municipalities.

South China Morning Post 
An unofficial list published by the South China Morning Post ranks 613 Chinese cities on four tiers. This list uses a variety of parameters as the basis of classification: population size, GDP, and  administrative hierarchy. According to the South China Morning Post, the Tier 1 Chinese cities consist of Beijing, Shanghai, Guangzhou, Tianjin, and Chongqing.

Criticism 
Some argue that the tier system limits opportunities for cities that are not ranked among higher tiers. Robert Lawrence Kuhn, an American investment banker and author of How China’s Leaders Think, argues that the so-called “second-tier” cities should actually be called “first-class opportunities,” given that these cities have been growth engines of the Chinese economy, boosted by huge amounts of investment, new infrastructure and an influx of new talent. Kuhn says that "roughly 170 Chinese cities have more than one million residents, but only five – Shanghai, Beijing, Tianjin, Guangzhou and Shenzhen – are considered “first-tier” in terms of size and per capita Gross Domestic Product. Some of these metropolises have populations that exceed that of many countries and are world-class in every way."

Notes

References

External links
Yicai Global's city rank

Administrative divisions of China